José Aguinaga (born 11 May 1995) is a Spanish footballer who plays as a midfielder.

Career

Youth career
Born in Madrid, Aguinaga began his career playing for Rayo Vallecano's youth setup before moving to Real Madrid's cantera. After two years with Real Madrid, Aguinaga joined the youth system of Getafe CF.

Aguinaga also played four years of college soccer at Rider University between 2014 and 2017. While at Rider, Aguinaga made 76 appearances, scored 18 goals and tallied 32 assists.

While with the Broncs, Aguinaga also appeared for Premier Development League sides Seattle Sounders FC U-23 and New York Red Bulls U-23.

New York Red Bulls
On January 21, 2018, Aguinaga was drafted in the fourth round (85th overall) of the 2018 MLS SuperDraft by New York Red Bulls. On March 15, 2018, Aguinaga signed with New York Red Bulls II of the United Soccer League. On March 31, 2018, Aguinaga made his first appearance with New York, coming on as a second-half substitute in 5–2 victory over Charleston Battery. On April 7, 2018, Aguinaga scored his first goal for New York, the equalizing goal in a 1–1 draw with Richmond Kickers. On April 14, 2018, Aguinaga started his first match for New York, scoring one goal in a 5–0 victory over Tampa Bay Rowdies.

Phoenix Rising
Aguinaga was signed by Phoenix Rising FC on December 18, 2018.

El Paso Locomotive
On 8 January 2021, Aguinaga moved to USL Championship side El Paso Locomotive. He left El Paso following their 2021 season.

Career statistics

References

External links 
 
 Riders Profile

1995 births
Living people
Spanish footballers
Association football midfielders
El Paso Locomotive FC players
New York Red Bulls draft picks
New York Red Bulls II players
New York Red Bulls U-23 players
Phoenix Rising FC players
Rider Broncs men's soccer players
Seattle Sounders FC U-23 players
Spanish expatriate footballers
Footballers from Madrid
USL Championship players
USL League Two players